The 1946 NYU Violets football team was an American football team that represented New York University as an independent during the 1946 college football season. 

In their third and final season under head coach John J. Weinheimer, the Violets compiled a 5–3 record, their first winning record of the 1940s, though they were outscored 163–101.

NYU's home opener featured its first return to Manhattan since 1941, with a visit to its former home field at the Polo Grounds. The Violets closed out the year with two dates at another former home field, the original Yankee Stadium. The team played just one game at its on-campus home field, Ohio Field in University Heights, The Bronx.

Schedule

References

NYU
NYU Violets football seasons
NYU Violets football
University Heights, Bronx
Sports in the Bronx